Rockdale is a city in Milam County, Texas, United States. Its population was 5,323 at the 2020 census. It is about 41 miles west of College Station.

History
In 1873, the town developed as the International-Great Northern Railroad came through the area. Rockdale was named for a nearby rock that stood 12 feet high and had a circumference of 20 feet. Rockdale was incorporated in 1878.

Geography

Rockdale is located at  (30.654674, –97.007439).

Climate

The climate in this area is characterized by hot, humid summers and generally mild to cool winters. According to the Köppen climate classification, Rockdale has a humid subtropical climate, Cfa on climate maps.

Demographics

As of the 2020 United States census, there were 5,323 people, 2,026 households, and 1,154 families residing in the city.

As of the census of 2017, 5,605 people, 2,088 households, and 1,395 families were residing in the city. The population density was 1,343.3 people per square mile (670.9/km). The 2,379 housing units averaged 759.2 per square mile (293.5/km). The racial makeup of the city was 70.69% White, 14.29% African American, 0.35% Native American, 0.42% Asian, 12.23% from other races, and 2.02% from two or more races. Hispanics or Latinos of any race were 21.93% of the population.

Of the 2,077 households,  33.1% had children under the age of 18 living with them, 51.9% were married couples living together, 13.0% had a female householder with no husband present, and 31.6% were not families. About 28.2% of all households were made up of individuals, and 15.6% had someone living alone who was 65 years of age or older. The average household size was 2.55, and the average family size was 3.14.

In the city, the age distribution was  28.5% under 18, 8.2% from 18 to 24, 24.7% from 25 to 44, 19.6% from 45 to 64, and 19.1% who were 65 or older. The median age was 36 years. For every 100 females, there were 89.4 males. For every 100 females age 18 and over, there were 83.1 males.

The median income for a household in the city was $34,612, and for a family was $39,491. Males had a median income of $30,758 versus $20,692 for females. The per capita income for the city was $17,618. About 13.2% of families and 18.3% of the population were below the poverty line, including 27.7% of those under age 18 and 9.7% of those age 65 or over.

Economy
Rockdale was the site of a large Alcoa aluminium smelting facility, which could produce 1.67 million pounds of aluminum per day. The Alcoa plant profoundly changed the city, as noted in a Saturday Evening Post article by Rockdale native George Sessions Perry. Within a few years of its arrival in 1952, Rockdale almost doubled in population, changing in character from a predominantly agricultural economy to one heavily driven by manufacturing jobs. Smelting operations were halted at the Alcoa plant in 2008. The Alcoa plant closed in February 2014 when production at the atomizer ceased.

Rockdale was also the site of the Sandow Power Plant, which closed in 2018.

Two cryptocurrency miners, Bitdeer, a division of Bitmain, and Riot Blockchain, formerly known as Bioptix, occupy former Alcoa facilities less than half a mile apart in Rockdale, using electricity transmission lines built to connect smelters to the power plant.

Education
The City of Rockdale is served by the Rockdale Independent School District.

Media
 The Rockdale Reporter
 KRXT radio

Notable people
 Stan Blinka, former NFL linebacker for the New York Jets, played for Rockdale High School
 Lee Roy Caffey, NFL linebacker; retired to Rockdale
 Le'Raven Clark, NFL footballer with the Philadelphia Eagles, is from Rockdale
 Kenneth Cockrell, NASA astronaut; graduated from Rockdale High School in 1968
 Pee Wee Crayton, Blues guitarist; was born in Rockdale
 Mary Sue Whipp Hubbard, the third wife of L. Ron Hubbard, was a Rockdale native
 Dan Kubiak, served several terms in the Texas House of Representatives while living in Rockdale His younger brother, L. B. Kubiak, also a Rockdale resident, held the same House seat from 1983 to 1991.
 Billy Ray Locklin, former AFL and Canadian Football League defensive back, played for Aycock High School in Rockdale
 Gordon McKee, Former track and field athlete; competed for Rockdale High School
 Liz Galloway McQuitter, born in Rockdale, played professional basketball in the Women's Professional Basketball League, coached women's college basketball, and retired as head coach of the Rockdale High School Lady Tigers
 George Sessions Perry, Author; was born in Rockdale and lived much of his life there
 Sam Williams, Former NFL defensive back; played for Rockdale High School
 Leroy Wright, former American Basketball Association player and coach, played basketball and football at  Aycock High School in Rockdale

References

External links
 City of Rockdale official website
 The Rockdale Reporter

Cities in Milam County, Texas
Cities in Texas